The steam locomotive exhaust system consists of those parts of a steam locomotive which together discharge exhaust steam from the cylinders in order to increase the draught through the fire.  It usually consists of the blastpipe (or first stage nozzle), smokebox, and chimney, although later designs also include second and third stage nozzles.

History 
The primacy of discovery of the effect of directing the exhaust steam up the chimney as a means of providing draft through the fire is the matter of some controversy, Ahrons (1927) devoting significant attention to this matter. The exhaust from the cylinders on the first steam locomotive – built by Richard Trevithick – was directed up the chimney, and he noted its effect on increasing the draft through the fire at the time. At Wylam, Timothy Hackworth also employed a blastpipe on his earliest locomotives, but it is not clear whether this was an independent discovery or a copy of Trevithick's design. Shortly after Hackworth, George Stephenson also employed the same method but again it is not clear whether it was an independent discovery or a copy of a design from one of the other engineers.

The locomotives at the time employed either a single flue boiler or a single return flue, with the fire grate at one end of the flue. For boilers of this design the blast of a contracted orifice blastpipe was too strong, and would lift the fire. It was not until the development of the multi-tube boiler that the centrally positioned, contracted orifice blastpipe became standard. The combination of multi-tube boiler and steam blast are often cited as the principal reasons for the high performance of Rocket of 1829 at the Rainhill Trials.

Description 
Soon after the power of the steam blast was discovered it became apparent that a smokebox was needed beneath the chimney, to provide a space in which the exhaust gases emerging from the boiler tubes can mix with the steam.  This had the added advantage of allowing access to collect the ash drawn through the fire tubes by the draught.  The blastpipe, from which steam is emitted, was mounted directly beneath the chimney at the bottom of the smokebox.

The steam blast is largely self-regulating: an increase in the rate of steam consumption by the cylinders increases the blast, which increases the draught and hence the temperature of the fire. 

Modern locomotives are also fitted with a blower, which is a device that releases steam directly into the smokebox for use when a greater draught is needed without a greater volume of steam passing through the cylinders. An example of such situation is when the regulator is closed suddenly, or the train passes through a tunnel. If a single line tunnel is poorly ventilated, a locomotive entering at high speed can cause a rapid compression of the air within the tunnel. This compressed air may enter the chimney with substantial force. This can be extremely dangerous if the firebox door is open at the time. For this reason the blower is often turned on in these situations, to counteract the compression effect.

Later development 
The aim of exhaust system development is to obtain maximum smokebox vacuum with minimum back pressure on the pistons.

Little development of the basic principles of smokebox design took place until 1908, when the first comprehensive examination of steam-raising performance was carried out by W.F.M. Goss of Purdue University.  These principles were adopted on the Great Western Railway by Churchward, and later developed by Samuel Ell in the 1950s using the GWR (then nationalised under BR) stationary testing plant.  Ell was able to double the maximum steaming rate of the GWR Manor class by apparently minor alterations to the front end design, and more than doubled the rate for an LNER V2.

Andre Chapelon made a significant improvement with his Kylchap exhaust which incorporated a Kyala spreader (second stage nozzle) and third stage cowl between the blastpipe (first stage nozzle) and chimney.  This became popular at the end of the steam era (early-mid 20th century) and was used on the Nigel Gresley's Mallard which holds the official world speed record for steam locomotives.  Other contemporary designs include the Giesl, and Lemaître exhausts which achieve the same aim by different means.

Further development was carried on by Chapelon's friend Livio Dante Porta, who developed the Kylpor, Lempor and Lemprex exhausts systems, and also developed sophisticated mathematical models to optimise their use for specific locomotives.

With the demise of commercial steam operations on mainline railways worldwide, there has been little funding for further development of steam locomotive technology, despite advances in materials technology and computer modelling techniques which might have enabled further improvements to efficiency.

References 

Locomotive parts
Steam locomotive technologies
Steam locomotive exhaust systems